Alecrim is a municipality in the state of Rio Grande do Sul, Brazil.

The municipality would be partially flooded by the proposed Panambí Dam.

References

Municipalities in Rio Grande do Sul